Pulival Kalyanam is a 2003 Indian Malayalam-language romantic comedy film directed by Shafi and written by Udayakrishna-Siby K. Thomas. The film stars Jayasurya and Kavya Madhavan, with Lal, Lalu Alex, Jagathy Sreekumar, Harisree Ashokan, Salim Kumar and Cochin Haneefa in supporting roles. The plot follows Harikrishnan, a rustic whose star-crossed romance with a girl (Ganga) from a rich family brings inadvertent consequences on the lives of people around them. The music was composed by Berny-Ignatius.

It is considered as one of the best comedy films in Malayalam cinema and the character Manavalan developed a cult following in the form of internet memes years after release. The film was remade in Kannada as Chellata (2006).

Plot

Harikrishnan is the adopted younger brother of Karunan. When Karunan loses his right hand in an accident, Hari at a young age takes responsibility of his family. Karunan's sister, Sreekutti is in love with the son of Paramanandam, who is unscrupulous and demands a huge dowry for the marriage to be made possible. To make this marriage possible Harikrishnan and Karunan take a loan from a financier Manavalan and invest it in a fireworks business, only to lose it completely in a fire.

Simultaneously, Harikrishnan gets his phone muddled with Ganga on account of both the models being the same. Ganga's father Raghavendra Sett is the boss of Paramanandam. Hari and Ganga have loads of comical misunderstandings before falling in love and deciding to get married. Of course this is not acceptable to Raghavendra Sett, and he puts obstacles in their way, like trying to get his daughter engaged to an eligible bachelor. The rest of the film shows how Hari and Ganga overcome those obstacles, and get married.

Cast 

 Jayasurya	as Harikrishnan/Hari, Ganga's love interest
 Kavya Madhavan as Ganga/Kaveri, Hari's love interest
 Lal as Karunan, Hari And Sreekutti's brother
 Lalu Alex as Raghavendra Seth
 Jagathy Sreekumar as Paramanandam
 Harisree Ashokan as Theeppori Kuttappan, Hari's best friend
 Salim Kumar as Manavalan
 Cochin Haneefa as Dharmendra
 Karthika as Sreekutty
 Nishanth Sagar as Ramesh Prasad
 T. P. Madhavan as Prasad
 Jose Pellissery as Swamy
 Kulappulli Leela as Kuttappan's Mother
 Ponnamma Babu as Paramanandam's Wife
 Kochu Preman as Santhosh Menon, Bank Manager
 Narayanankutty as Jayan, Taxi Driver
 Shaju Sreedhar as Murali
 Reena as Doctor
 Priyanka Anoop as Neelambari
 Beena Sabu as Kuttappan's Wife
 Arun Kumar as Young Harikrishnan
 Dimple Rose as Young Sreekutty
 Irshad as Chandrappan, Train Passenger

Soundtrack 
The film's soundtrack contains 6 songs, all composed by Berny Ignatius and Lyrics by Kaithapram.

Box office
The film was a commercial success at the box office.

Legacy
Pulival Kalyanam is regarded as one of the best comedy films in Malayalam cinema, a number of dialogues became catchphrases. Characters and scenes are frequently used in trolls. The character Manavalan gained a cult following in the form of internet memes in social media.

References

External links
 

2000s Malayalam-language films
2003 romantic comedy-drama films
2003 films
Indian romantic comedy-drama films
Films scored by Berny–Ignatius
Malayalam films remade in other languages
Films about Indian weddings
Films shot in Kochi
Films directed by Shafi
2003 comedy films
2003 drama films